The year 1813 in archaeology involved some significant events.

Explorations

Excavations
 Colosseum, Rome: The arena substructure is partly excavated during 1810–1814.
 Bremetennacum (Ribchester), Lancashire, England.

Finds
 J. L. Burckhardt finds the main Abu Simbel temple.
 The "Branwen ferch Llŷr" sepulchral urn is discovered on the banks of the river Alaw in Anglesey (Wales), it is later placed in the British Museum by Richard Llwyd.

Miscellaneous
 Society of Antiquaries of Newcastle upon Tyne established in England.

Publications

Births
 October 23 - Félix Ravaisson-Mollien, French philosopher and archaeologist (d. 1900).

Deaths

See also
 Roman Forum - excavations.

References

Archaeology
Archaeology by year
Archaeology
Archaeology